The 2012–13 Green Bay Phoenix men's basketball team represented the University of Wisconsin–Green Bay in the 2012–13 NCAA Division I men's basketball season. Their head coach was Brian Wardle who is his 3rd year. The Phoenix played their home games at the Resch Center and were members of the Horizon League. They finished the season 18–16, 10–6 in Horizon League play to finish in a tie for third place. They advanced to the semifinals of the Horizon League tournament where they lost to Valparaiso. They were invited to the 2013 CIT where they lost in the first round to Bradley.

Roster

Schedule

|-
!colspan=9| Exhibition

|-
!colspan=9| Regular season

|-
!colspan=12|2013 Horizon League men's basketball tournament

|-
!colspan=9| 2013 CIT

References

Green Bay Phoenix
Green Bay Phoenix men's basketball seasons
Green Bay
Wiscon
Wiscon